Alfonso Pitters (born 22 February 1963) is a Panamanian sprinter. He competed in the men's 100 metres at the 1984 Summer Olympics.

References

1963 births
Living people
Athletes (track and field) at the 1984 Summer Olympics
Athletes (track and field) at the 1991 Pan American Games
Panamanian male sprinters
Olympic athletes of Panama
Place of birth missing (living people)
Pan American Games competitors for Panama